State Route 161 (SR 161) is a  state highway near the beaches of Baldwin County near the Gulf of Mexico in the southwestern part of the U.S. state of Alabama. The southern terminus of the highway is at an intersection with SR 182 in the south-central part of Orange Beach. The northern terminus of the highway is at an intersection with SR 180 in the north-central part of Orange Beach.

Route description
SR 161 begins at an intersection with SR 182 (Perdido Beach Boulevard) on the Gulf of Mexico in the south-central part of Orange Beach. It travels to the north on four-lane undivided Orange Beach Boulevard past beach resort areas. The road turns northeast and becomes a five lane road with a center left-turn lane. It very briefly leaves the city limits of Orange Beach. It travels through a portion of Gulf State Park and then skirts along the eastern edge of the park. The highway re-enters Orange Beach and curves back to the north. It then travels through a mix of wooded wetlands and residential development. Farther north, SR 161 travels through housing subdivisions before continuing into wooded areas. The highway passes businesses prior to reaching its northern terminus, an intersection with SR 180 in the north-central part of Orange Beach. It serves as an alternate route for motorists heading north from the beaches of eastern Baldwin County to avoid traffic congestion in Gulf Shores. Along with SR 59 and SR 135, it is one of three highways that connect SR 182 and SR 180.

Major intersections

See also

References

External links

161
Transportation in Baldwin County, Alabama